This article displays the squads for the 2014 African Women's Handball Championship. Each team consists of 16 players.

Algeria

Head coach: Karim Achour

Angola

Head coach: Vivaldo Eduardo

Cameroon

Head coach: Jean Marie Zambo

Congo

Head coach: Jean Patrice Pahapa

DR Congo

Head coach: Celestin Mpoua

Guinea

Head coach: Kevin Decaux

Senegal

Head coach: Cheick Seck

Tunisia

Head coach: Paulo Pereira

References

External links
todor66.com

2014 Women squads
2014 in African handball
Handball squads